Harue (written: 春恵, 春詠, 春江, 治恵 or はる江) is a feminine Japanese given name. Notable people with the name include:

, Japanese actress
, Japanese politician
, Japanese alpine skier
Harue Oyama McVay (born 1920), American ceramist
, Japanese footballer
, Japanese shogi player
, Japanese playwright

Fictional characters
, a character in the manga series Saki: Achiga-hen - Episode of Side A

See also
Harue, Fukui, a former town in Sakai District, Fukui Prefecture, Japan
Harue Station, a railway station in Sakai, Fukui Prefecture, Japan

Japanese feminine given names